Arnold Weinstein (June 10, 1927 – September 4, 2005) was an American poet, playwright, and librettist, who referred to himself as a "theatre poet".

Weinstein is best known for his collaborations with composer William Bolcom, including the operas McTeague, based on the novel by Frank Norris, A View from the Bridge based on the play by Arthur Miller, and A Wedding, based on the film by Robert Altman. Bolcom described his work with Weinstein as a "true collaboration", and said about him that "He had such a gift for writing words that were singable, and that gave character. He was more influential on a lot of other people than people have taken into account."

With some frequency, Weinstein's work involved adapting the writing of others.  He said in an interview in 1992 that "An adaptation gives you a funny kind of limitation that makes it easier to improvise." His early work with Paul Sills, founder of the Second City Theater in Chicago, helped hone those improvisational skills.

Early life
Weinstein was born on June 10, 1927, in New York City to parents born in England, and grew up in Harlem and the Bronx.  In World War II, he enlisted in the U.S. Navy and saw service on a destroyer. Afterwards, he used the G.I. Bill to attend Hunter College, and later went to Harvard University for graduate studies. He eventually earned a Rhodes Scholarship.

Weinstein was associated with the '"New York School" of poets and painters in the 1950s and 1960s, during which time he developed close friendships with poet John Ashbery and painter Larry Rivers, among others. Weinstein would later collaborate with Rivers on What Did I Do? The Unauthorized Autobiography (1992).

Career
While Weinstein was on a Fulbright Fellowship to Florence, Italy, composer Darius Milhaud saw his libretto A Comedy of Horrors and loved it, but thinking it too American for his own use he gave it to William Bolcom, an American who was Milhaud's student at the time.  The result of the collaboration was Dynamite Tonite, an anti-war satire that opened in 1964 at the Actors Studio in Manhattan, with a cast that included Alvin Epstein and Gene Wilder.  The show was later presented at Yale Repertory Theater by Robert Brustein.

Weinstein's notable works include the long-running 1961 off-Broadway satire The Red Eye of Love, about an all-meat department store, and an adaptation of Ovid's Metamorphoses, originally present at the Yale Repertory Theater in 1969 and subsequently produced on Broadway in 1971. With a new rock/blues score provided by his then-collaborator, composer Tony Greco, Ovid's Metamorphoses debuted at Gian Carlo Menotti's Spoleto Festival dei Due Mondi in 1973. Weinstein collaborated with Greco on four subsequent original theatrical works: The American Revolution, which premiered in 1973 at Ford's Theatre, in Washington, D.C., directed by Paul Sills; a musical of  Weinstein's translation and adaptation of García Lorca's poetry titled Gypsy New York, presented at Cafe La Mama in 1974, produced by Gaby Rodgers, with art direction by Larry Rivers; Lady LIberty's Ice Cream Cone directed by Barbara Harris in 1974 at the New York Cultural Center; and the San Francisco A.C.T. production of America More Or Less, at the Marines Memorial Theatre in 1976.

Weinstein's operas with William Bolcom – McTeague (1992), A View from the Bridge (1999) and A Wedding (2004) – had their premieres at the Lyric Opera in Chicago.  View was also presented by the Metropolitan Opera in New York City in 2002.  The librettos for McTeague and A Wedding were collaborations with Robert Altman, who also directed the productions. Weinstein also provided the libretto for Bolcom's Medusa: Monodrama for Dramatic Soprano and String Orchestra which was premiered by conductor Dennis Russell Davies leading the Stuttgart Chamber Orchestra in May 2003, and the text for the composer's "music theater opera" Casino Paradise, which was presented by American Music Theater Festival (AMTF) in Philadelphia in 1990, and, in a revamped version, by Lincoln Center's "American Songbook" series in 2005. Weinstein's texts were also set to music by Bolcom as Cabaret Songs.

Weinstein wrote the lyrics to Shlemiel the First (1994), an adaptation of the Chełm stories of Isaac Bashevis Singer set to klezmer music, and Punch and Judy Get Divorced a 1996 theatre piece by post-modern choreographer-director-writer David Gordon and composer Edward Barnes, both of which were originally produced by Robert Brustein's American Repertory Theater in Cambridge, Massachusetts, and the American Music Theatre Festival in Philadelphia.

In his long career, Weinstein also collaborated with Philip Glass, Andy Warhol, Howard Kanovitz, and Marisol.  In addition to his writing, Weinstein taught playwriting at Yale and Columbia Universities.

Personal life
Weinstein was married three times, each marriage ending in divorce, and he had a daughter, who is deceased. In 1997, he was diagnosed with inoperable liver cancer, and received treatment from Dr. Emanuel Revici.  Weinstein, who was a decade-long resident of the Hotel Chelsea in Manhattan, died on September 4, 2005, at the age of 78, of liver cancer.

References
Notes

External links
Arnold Weinstein at the Internet Off-Broadway Database

Obituary (The New York Times)
Obituary (Playbill)

1927 births
2005 deaths
20th-century American dramatists and playwrights
Deaths from liver cancer
Hunter College alumni
Harvard University alumni
Writers from New York City
American opera librettists
United States Navy personnel of World War II
Deaths from cancer in New York (state)